Luninsky (masculine), Luninskaya (feminine), or Luninskoye (neuter) may refer to:

Luninsky District, a district of Penza Oblast, Russia
Luninskaya, a rural locality (a village) in Moscow Oblast, Russia

See also
Lunino